"Beautiful" is a song written by Lynsey de Paul. It first appeared as the B-side to her 1977 single "You Give Me Those Feelings" on the Polydor record label and reflected her real life philosophy that all forms of life are beautiful, including household flies. This recording was co-produced by de Paul and Jon Kelly. An extended and reworked version of the song with snatches of songs from de Paul's 1979 Tigers and Fireflies album as a reprise that was produced by Rupert Holmes, was featured as the last track on this album. The latter version of the song was finally released on CD on Lynsey's 2013 double CD anthology Into My Music, whereas the original version has yet to be released on CD.

References

Lynsey de Paul songs
Songs written by Lynsey de Paul
1977 songs